The South African cricket team toured India from 29 September to 7 December 2015. The tour consisted of four Test matches, five One Day International (ODI) and three Twenty20 International (T20I) matches. This was the first time a four-match Test series between the two nations has been played in India and the first time that South Africa played a T20I against India in India. India won the Test series while South Africa won both the ODI and T20I series.

Starting with this series, all bilateral tours between India and South Africa were called the Mahatma Gandhi-Nelson Mandela series, with the teams playing for the  Freedom Trophy.

Squads

South Africa's David Wiese was ruled out of the T20I series with a fractured hand and was replaced by Albie Morkel. Rilee Rossouw was ruled out of the ODI series following a stress fracture to his foot and was replaced by Khaya Zondo. Harbhajan Singh was added to India's ODI squad as Ravichandran Ashwin sustained a left side strain injury during the first ODI. JP Duminy was ruled out of the last two ODI matches after suffering a hand injury. He was replaced by Dean Elgar. Duminy is expected to be fit for the Test series. Vernon Philander was ruled out of the last three Test matches after suffering an ankle injury and was replaced by Kyle Abbott. Marchant de Lange was added to South Africa's Test squad as cover for Dale Steyn.

Tour matches

T20: India A vs South Africans

Two-day: Indian Board President's XI vs South Africans

T20I series

1st T20I

2nd T20I

3rd T20I

ODI series

1st ODI

South Africa won the toss and chose to bat first reaching 5/303 in its innings. Three of its top four batsmen — Hashim Amla (37), Faf du Plessis (62) and AB de Villiers — passed thirty runs setting a strong platform, with the latter putting on 65 runs for the sixth wicket Farhaan Behardien (35 off 19). De Villiers finished unbeaten on 104 off 73 balls, getting to his 21st hundred with a six off the last ball of the innings.

India's reply began strongly before Shikhar Dhawan lost his wicket in the eighth over. Rohit Sharma (150 off 133 balls) and Ajinkya Rahane (60 off 82 balls) put on 149 runs for the second wicket, before the latter was dismissed in the 34th over. Wickets fell at regular intervals henceforth, and India finished five runs short of the target at 7/298 after 50 overs.

2nd ODI

Opting to bat first after winning to toss, India got off to a poor start losing Rohit Sharma in the second over. After Shikhar Dhawan was dismissed in the 13th over, wickets kept falling at regular intervals at the other end of MS Dhoni, who finished unbeaten at 92 off 86 balls. With Ajinkya Rahane, the only other batsmen with a half-century (51), India finished its innings at 9/247.

South Africa began its chase well and were placed comfortably at 3/139 after 25 overs. After two wickets fell off consecutive overs, in the 26th and 27th, the lower-middle order and tail failed to get runs. It lost wickets at regular intervals before being dismissed for 225 in the 44th of its innings, with Axar Patel finishing off with his career-best figures of 3/39, from his 10 overs.

3rd ODI

South Africa won the toss and chose to bat first. David Miller was sent to open the innings for the first time in the series with Quinton de Kock, who put on 72 runs together. de Kock put on 118 runs together with Faf du Plessis (60 off 63 balls), on course, reaching his hundred off 114 balls. The team finished with 7/270 after 50 overs.

India, chasing 271, began well before losing Shikhar Dhawan in the 11th over. Virat Kohli (77 off 99) batted in two notable partnerships — with Rohit Sharma (65 off 74) for the second wicket and MS Dhoni (47 off 61) for the third wicket. Morne Morkel (4/39 off 10 overs) picked up the wickets of Dhoni and Kohli in his 9th and 10th overs, as India's middle order fell, before finishing off at 6/252 after 50 overs.

4th ODI

India won the toss, chose to bat first compiled a total of 299 losing 8 wickets. Rohit Sharma's dismissal in the fifth over brought Virat Kohli to the crease, who batted in two century partnerships. He put on 104 runs with Ajinkya Rahane (45 off 53 balls) for the third wicket and 127 with Suresh Raina (53 off 52 balls) for the fourth wicket. Kohli finished with 138 off 140 balls before being dismissed in the 49th over by Kagiso Rabada, who finished with figures off 3/54 off his 10 overs.

Chasing 300, South Africa lost early wickets, and then at regular intervals, losing 3 wickets for 32 runs between the 10th and 20th over. AB de Villiers came to the crease on Faf du Plessis's dismissal in the 15th over, and brought his hundred up off 98 balls, with a six in the 43rd over. Losing wickets at the other end at regular intervals, his partnership with Farhaan Behardien of 56 runs was the highest of the South African innings. They finished 9/264 in the 50 overs. With his hundred, his 22nd, de Villiers went past Herschelle Gibbs and Hashim Amla as the most hundreds by a South African batsman.

5th ODI

South Africa won the toss and chose to bat first on a flat pitch. It lost its first wicket with Hashim Amla getting dismissed for 23 in the fourth over. Quinton de Kock made his second hundred of the series, coming off 78 balls and put on 154 runs with Faf du Plessis for the second wicket before losing his wicket in the 27th over. du Plessis got his hundred as well off 105 balls before being retiring due to cramps, after scoring 133 from 115 balls. AB de Villiers batted on and reached his hundred off 57 balls and was dismissed at 119 off 61 balls, before the team completed its innings at 4/438.

Chasing 439, India lost its first wicket in the fifth over and second in the eighth over, before Shikhar Dhawan (60 off 59) and Ajinkya Rahane (87 off 58) put on 112 runs for the third wicket. Wickets continued to fall henceforth, before the team was dismissed in the 36th over for 224.

Many records were equaled or broken on course of the match. South Africa's total of 438 was the joint third-highest in ODIs. It was only the second time that three batsmen from the same team scored individual centuries in an ODI innings. Bhuvneshwar Kumar's concession of 106 runs off his ten overs was the second-highest in an ODI. Hashim Amla became the fastest to reach 6,000 runs in ODIs, in 123 innings.

Test series

1st Test

On a pitch which looked heavily in favour of spinners, Virat Kohli won the toss and India elected to bat. Despite a good start and base given by Murali Vijay and Cheteshwar Pujara, India were bowled out for 201 in their 1st innings. However, the Indian spinners stuck to make sure that South Africa, despite AB de Villiers's 63, conceded a lead of 17 runs. India again had a strong foundation laid by Vijay and Pujara after Shikhar Dhawan picked up a pair. But a collapse of 38/8 meant that South Africa needed 218 to win the Test. The Indian spinners led by Ravichandran Ashwin and Ravindra Jadeja bowled South Africa out for 109 to hand India a 108 run victory. The match was the fourth consecutive match in India which finished within three days.

2nd Test

The 2nd Test started with Indian captain Virat Kohli's surprise decision to bowl first. India included Stuart Binny and Ishant Sharma in place of Amit Mishra and Umesh Yadav. The Indian spinners, Ravichandran Ashwin and Ravindra Jadeja, took 8 wickets between them to dismiss South Africa for 214. Indian openers Murli Vijay and Shikhar Dhawan started positively and at the end of Day 1 India was in a strong position. However, strong and persistent rain on next 4 days meant that the match ended in a draw without any further play.

3rd Test

India batted first and despite a strong start, a middle-order collapse meant India were all out for 215. The day ended with Dean Elgar and Hashim Amla batting. The first session on day 2 changed the game decisively in India's favour after South Africa were reduced to 17/5. Despite a counter-attacking innings from JP Duminy, India bowled them out for 79. The Indian 2nd innings was a repeat of their 1st innings with India suffering a middle-order collapse to be all out for 173, setting South Africa a target of 310 runs. The 2nd day ended with Dean Elgar and Hashim Amla batting. The 3rd day of the match was the final day as South Africa, despite a long partnership from captain Amla and Faf du Plessis were dismissed for 185 with Ravichandran Ashwin taking seven wickets. The pitch for the match was heavily criticized for offering extreme turn and variable bounce. The pitch was later rated as being poor by the ICC.

4th Test

The fourth and final Test of the series was the only one which went beyond the third day. India again won the toss and chose to bat but a familiar batting collapse took place. However, a 98 run partnership between Ajinkya Rahane and Ravichandran Ashwin resulted in the first 300 run innings of the series. Rahane scored the first century of the series as well. South Africa's reply was a repeat of their earlier batting collapses, with batsmen after batsmen falling to spin bowling. India in their 2nd innings on back of second century for Rahane and a fighting 88 from captain Virat Kohli, declared at 267 to set South Africa a target of 481. However, a marathon blockathon from Hashim Amla, AB de Villiers, Faf du Plessis and Temba Bavuma could not help South Africa, as India won by 337 runs in the final session of the series. Rahane for his two centuries was named the man of the match, while Ashwin's 31 wickets made him the man of the series. Rahane became only the 5th Indian batsmen to score two centuries in a match while Ashwin's 31 wickets were the second highest for an Indian bowler behind Harbhajan Singh's 32 wickets in the 2001 series against Australia.

Anti-Pakistan protests at Mumbai
On the morning of 19 October, BCCI president Shashank Manohar and PCB chairman Shaharyar Khan were to discuss a proposed India-Pakistan series in December. Just before the meeting, a group of 50 workers from the Shiv Sena, a political party, stormed into the BCCI headquarters in Mumbai, shouting anti-Pakistan slogans and demanding the cancellation of the series. They also threatened to stop Aleem Dar from officiating in the Mumbai ODI.

Aleem Dar, a member of the elite panel of ICC umpires, had officiated in the first three ODIs, and was also scheduled to umpire in the fourth and fifth ODIs, in Chennai and Mumbai. In response to the above incident ICC decided to withdraw Dar from the last two ODIs. Wasim Akram and Shoaib Akhtar, a part of the commentary team, decided to leave India before the fifth ODI at Mumbai.

References

External links
 Series home at ESPN Cricinfo

2015 in Indian cricket
2015 in South African cricket
International cricket competitions in 2015–16
South African cricket tours of India